Venkateshwarlu or Venkateswarlu is an Indian surname. Notable people with the surname include:

 Avudari Venkateswarlu, Indian politician
 B. Venkateshwarlu (born 1973), Indian businessman, journalist, writer, and film director
 Ummareddy Venkateswarlu (born 1935), Indian politician

Indian surnames